This is the discography of American adult contemporary saxophonist Kenny G. It includes Kenny G's solo albums, singles, music videos, and recorded appearances with other artists. The album section of the discography is divided into four sections: studio albums (including holiday albums), live albums, compilation albums, and EPs.

Albums

Studio albums

Live albums

Compilation albums

Notes
 Peaked position on Billboard Top Contemporary Jazz chart.
 Peaked at #13 on Billboard Top Contemporary Jazz chart.

Extended plays

Singles

As lead artist

As featured artist

Other charted songs

Other appearances

Music videos

References

Discographies of American artists
Jazz discographies